Trzebiechów  (German Trebschen) is a village in Zielona Góra County, Lubusz Voivodeship, in western Poland. It is the seat of the gmina (administrative district) called Gmina Trzebiechów. The village has a population of 920.

History 
Before 1945 the village of Trebschen was part of Germany (Province of Brandenburg).

People 
 Ulrich Diesing (1911–1945), Luftwaffe general
Princess Eleonore Reuss of Köstritz (1860-1917), future queen of Bulgaria, was born in the palace of Trebschen
 Heinrich XXIV Reuss of Köstritz (1855–1910), German composer
Krzysztof Pawlak, footballer.

References

Villages in Zielona Góra County